The Roman Catholic Diocese of Inongo is a diocese located in the city of Inongo  in the Ecclesiastical province of Kinshasa in the Democratic Republic of the Congo.

History
 29 June 1953: Established as Apostolic Vicariate of Inongo from the Apostolic Vicariate of Léopoldville
 10 November 1959: Promoted as Diocese of Inongo

Bishops
 Vicar Apostolic of Inongo (Latin Rite) 
 Bishop Jan van Cauwelaert, C.I.C.M. (6 Jan 1954 – 10 Nov 1959 ); see below
 Bishops of Inongo (Latin Rite)
Jan van Cauwelaert, C.I.C.M. (10 Nov 1959 - 12 Jun 1967 ); see above 
Léon Lesambo Ndamwize (12 Jun 1967 - 27 Jul 2005 ) 
Philippe Nkiere Keana, C.I.C.M. (27 Jul 2005 - 31 Mar 2018 )
Donatien Bafuidinsoni Maloko-Mana, S.J. (31 Mar 2018 - )

Auxiliary bishop
Laurent Monsengwo Pasinya (1980-1981), appointed Auxiliary Bishop of Kisangani; future Cardinal

See also
Roman Catholicism in the Democratic Republic of the Congo

Sources
 GCatholic.org
 Catholic Hierarchy

Inongo
Roman Catholic dioceses in the Democratic Republic of the Congo
Christian organizations established in 1953
Roman Catholic dioceses and prelatures established in the 20th century
1953 establishments in the Belgian Congo
Roman Catholic Ecclesiastical Province of Kinshasa